Adultery (Spanish:Adulterio) is a 1945 Mexican drama film directed by José Díaz Morales and starring Rosario Granados, Julio Villarreal and Hilde Krüger.

Plot
A man commits suicide due to his wife's infidelity. The man's father then attempts to determine by scientific means which of his granddaughters is not his biological grandchild.

Cast
 Rosario Granados as Laura 
 Julio Villarreal as Don Agustín Escandón  
 Hilde Krüger as Graciela 
 Prudencia Grifell as Doña Lupita 
 Nuri Conde as María  
 Carlos Amador as Pedro  
 Maruja Grifell as Gregoria  
 Roberto Corell 
 Jesús Valero
 Edmundo Espino as Alcalde  
 Estanislao Schillinsky as Damán 
 Manuel Arvide 
 Roberto Cañedo as Amante de Graciela  
 María Gentil Arcos as Esposa de alcalde  
 Ramón G. Larrea
 Eduardo Noriega as Amante de Graciela 
 Ignacio Peón 
 Paz Villegas

References

Bibliography 
 Goble, Alan. The Complete Index to Literary Sources in Film. Walter de Gruyter, 1999.

External links 
 

1945 films
1940s historical drama films
Mexican historical drama films
1940s Spanish-language films
Films based on works by Benito Pérez Galdós
Films directed by José Díaz Morales
Mexican black-and-white films
1945 drama films
1940s Mexican films